Archie Blake may refer to:

 Archie Blake: a Sea-side Story, a novel by Elizabeth Eiloart
 Archie Blake (born 1906), American mathematician, discoverer of the Blake canonical form